The 1974 Italian Open – Men's singles was an event of the 1974 Italian Open tennis tournament and was played at the Foro Italico in Rome, Italy from 26 May through 3 June 1974. Ilie Năstase was the defending champion. Third-seeded Björn Borg won the singles title, defeating first-seeded Ilie Năstase in the final, 6–3, 6–4, 6–2.

Seeds

Draw

Finals

Top half

Section 1

Section 2

Bottom half

Section 3

Section 4

References

External links
 ITF tournament edition details

Italian Open
Italian Open (tennis)
Italian Open
Italian Open
1974 in Italian tennis